Eulimnia is a New Zealand genus of flies in the family Sciomyzidae, the marsh flies or snail-killing flies.

Species
E. milleri Tonnoir & Malloch, 1928
E. philpotti Tonnoir & Malloch, 1928

References

Sciomyzidae
Sciomyzoidea genera